The Dublin Irish were a minor league baseball team based in Dublin, Georgia. The team played in the Georgia State League from 1949 until 1956. However the team was first named the Dublin Green Sox. In 1952 they were first an affiliate of the Cincinnati Reds, however the following year they became affiliated with the Pittsburgh Pirates. The team stayed affiliated with the Pirates until 1956.

Dublin was represented again 1958 in the Georgia–Florida League, as the Dublin Orioles. The Orioles left Dublin after the season, and the city did not field a team until 1962. The Milwaukee Braves placed an affiliate, the Dublin Braves, in Dublin and played there for one last season.

The ballpark

The Irish played at Lovett Park, which was built in 1946 and eventually demolished in 1990. It was located at Kellam Road and Marcus Street.

Notable alumni

Baseball Hall of Fame alumni

 Earl Weaver (1958, MGR) Inducted, 1996

Notable alumni

 Steve Barber (1958) 2 x MLB All-Star

 Bill Robinson (1962)

References

External links
 Baseball Reference -Dublin, Georgia

Laurens County, Georgia
Baseball teams established in 1949
Baseball teams disestablished in 1962
Defunct Georgia-Florida League teams
Defunct Georgia State League teams
Professional baseball teams in Georgia (U.S. state)
Baltimore Orioles minor league affiliates
Cincinnati Reds minor league affiliates
Milwaukee Braves minor league affiliates
Pittsburgh Pirates minor league affiliates
1949 establishments in Georgia (U.S. state)
1962 disestablishments in Georgia (U.S. state)
Defunct baseball teams in Georgia